Myrick may refer to:

People
 Myrick (surname)
 Myrick Davies ( ? - 1781), American politician

Places
 Myrick, Oregon, an unincorporated historic community in Umatilla County, Oregon, in the United States

See also
 Myricks (disambiguation)